Pío Pico State Historic Park is the site of El Ranchito, also known as the Pío Pico Adobe or Pío Pico Mansion, the final home of Pío Pico, the last Governor of Alta California under Mexican rule and a pivotal figure in early California history.  Located in Whittier, California, at 6003 Pioneer Blvd. near Whittier Blvd. and Interstate 605, it is California Historical Landmark No. 127, listed as "Casa de Governor Pío Pico". Just west of the park is the San Gabriel River. Across the river is the city that bears his name—Pico Rivera. The park consists of the adobe and about three acres of surrounding land.

History

Starting in 1848, after the Mexican–American War, Pío Pico began acquiring the  Rancho Paso de Bartolo, and built a home in 1853. The home was damaged by the flooding of 1867, which set the San Gabriel River to its present course, and was nearly destroyed in 1882 by flooding. The structure was completely redone into its current form, adding American-style elements into the traditional Californio design. In 1892, Pio Pico was evicted from the property by Bernard Cohn, an American lawyer. When taking what he thought was a loan from Cohn in 1883, Pico, who could not read or write English, had conveyed the deed for the property, and courts ruled with Cohn. Pico died a pauper two years later at his daughter's home.

By 1898 the City of Whittier began buying up parts of the property to construct a water pumping facility. In 1907, local Whittier citizens, led by Harriet Williams Russell Strong, were able to have the site made a historic monument. Strong, who had known Pico since 1867, purchased the property and had it restored in 1909. The property was conveyed to the State of California in 1917 and designated one of its first State Historic Parks in 1927. The State of California did further renovations in 1944. The Adobe was seriously damaged in the 1987 Whittier Narrows earthquake, forcing closure. While funds were being raised for restoration, the additional damage was caused by the 1994 Northridge earthquake. Finally, in 1996 a Los Angeles County proposition earmarked US$2.5 million for the park's restoration. Restoration of the structure began in 2000 and the historic landscape in 2002, with the park re-opened on 20 September 2003.

At the re-opening ceremonies, the Battle of Rio San Gabriel, which occurred nearby during the Mexican–American War, was re-enacted.

Proposed for closure
Pio Pico State Historic Park was one of the 48 California state parks proposed for closure in January 2008 by California's Governor Arnold Schwarzenegger as part of a deficit reduction program. None of the proposed closures occurred then, however, the park was again targeted along with some seventy state parks for closure in 2011 by Governor Jerry Brown. The Friends of Pio Pico and the City of Whittier together raised $80,000 to keep the park from closing.

California Historical Landmark 
California Historical Landmark Marker No. 127 at the site reads:
NO. 127 CASA DE GOVERNOR PÍO PICO - Following the Mexican War, Pío Pico, last Mexican governor, acquired 9,000-acre Rancho Paso de Bartolo and built here an adobe home that was destroyed by the floods of 1883-1884. His second adobe casa, now known as Pío Pico Mansion, represents a compromise between Mexican and American cultures. While living here the ex-Governor was active in the development of American California.

Appearances in popular culture
The historic park was featured by Huell Howser in California's Golden Parks Episode 127.

References

External links

 Pio Pico State Historic Park official website.
 About the Pio Pico State Historic Park, California State Parks.

Adobe buildings and structures in California
California State Historic Parks
Museums in Los Angeles County, California
Historic house museums in California
Parks in Los Angeles County, California
Mexican California
History of Los Angeles County, California
History of Los Angeles
Houses in Los Angeles County, California
California Historical Landmarks
Houses on the National Register of Historic Places in California
Buildings and structures on the National Register of Historic Places in Los Angeles County, California
Whittier, California
San Gabriel Valley
Protected areas established in 1927